The "March of the Siberian Riflemen", or alternatively the "Siberian Riflemen's March", is a Russian war song from World War I and the Russian Civil War. It is believed that the song melody was composed by Yuri Cherniavsky in 1915 for recruitment, but it is possible that it circulated in Russia even before. Vladimir Gilyarovsky wrote text for the song, to help recruit Baikal Cossacks into the Imperial Army. His text has three versions. Peter Parfenov wrote the latest version of the song after the 1922 Battle of Volochayevka. Many other songs use this same melody, like the French anarchist song "La Makhnovtchina" and the Red Russian song "Across the Valleys and Across the Hills", among others.

"Across the Valleys and Across the Hills" itself has many versions in other languages, including Serbo-Croatian, Greek, German, French, Hungarian, Hebrew and Kurdish among others. The song was adapted by the Yugoslav Partisans and used in World War II.

History 
The lyrics were penned by Russian writer Vladimir Gilyarovsky and meant to inspire the Baikal Cossacks conscripted for World War I. Later, the song became an anthem to the Siberian Cossacks, who swore to the Russian Empire and kept fighting even when the areas free from the Bolsheviks had shrunk to Siberia and the Far East. The song was so popular that the Russian communists re-penned the lyrics to their favor. The song served as a march during the Russian Civil War for the White Army as the March of the Siberian Riflemen under the command of Admiral Kolchak after he established the anti-communist Provisional Siberian Government. The song also served as a commemorative march for General (then Staff Colonel) Mikhail Drozdovsky and the Volunteer Army, after the Iași–Don March.

After the end of the Russian Civil War, the song was popular within the RSFSR and the USSR, with communist partisan fighters in Yugoslavia and German-occupied Russia using the song. The song is commonly played by the Alexandrov Ensemble. In the Middle East, the Russian song also got Hebrew texts written by the poets Avraham Shlonsky - Halokh halkha hevraya - a translation after Alexander Blok, which in several mobilizing versions served the Zionist Socialist Hashomer Hatzair movement and the Palestinian Communist Youth (now BANKI)  movement in the Mandatory Palestine and then in Israel -  and Didi Menosi - Mul gesher hanahar - which is known in the interpretation by the Israeli Gevatron ensemble. The music was used also as the first melody for the anthem of Palmakh Jewish shock units in Palestine.

Original lyrics

Partisan's Song lyrics

La Makhnovtchina lyrics

Serbo-Croatian lyrics

Alternative version
Basil Davidson recites alternative lyrics as he heard them from Yugoslav Partisans in his 1946 book Partisan Picture:

Greek lyrics

Hebrew lyrics

French Lyrics (March of the Siberian Riflemen)

Notes

References

External links
 French translation
 March of the Siberian Riflemen on YouTube

Russian songs
Soviet songs
Yugoslav Partisan songs
Anarchist songs
Anti-fascist music
Lidia Ruslanova songs